Canfield is an unincorporated community in Lafayette County, Arkansas, United States.

Notes

Unincorporated communities in Lafayette County, Arkansas
Unincorporated communities in Arkansas